Barkly Work Camp is a low-security correctional work camp near Tennant Creek in the Northern Territory of Australia.

History

The Barkly Work Camp opened on 8 September 2011 with a capacity of 50 prisoners. It aims to rehabilitate inmates by providing training and employment opportunities.

As of April 2018, the world camp housed 61 prisoners, which is 122 per cent of its design capacity.

References

External links
 Official website

 

Prisons in the Northern Territory
Buildings and structures in Tennant Creek
2011 establishments in Australia